Burned is the debut and only album released by Electrafixion in 1995. It reached No. 38 on the UK Albums Chart in October of that year.

Different releases 
Burned was originally released in 1995 on CD with eleven tracks.

In 2007, the album was reissued in the UK by Korova Records in remastered in expanded form, with the four tracks from the Zephyr EP and a remixed version of "Never" on the first CD. A second CD was included containing B-sides and live recordings from their Shepherd's Bush Empire concert on 22 October 1995.

Singles/EPs 
The tracks on the album which have been released as singles are "Lowdown", "Never" and "Sister Pain". An EP titled Zephyr was released which included the tracks "Zephyr", "Burned" and "Mirrorball". "Rain on Me" from the Zephyr EP was not included on the CD until the 2007 reissue.

Track listing 
All tracks written by Ian McCulloch and Will Sergeant except where noted.

Disc one 
 "Feel My Pulse" – 4:23
 "Sister Pain" – 4:15
 "Lowdown" (McCulloch, Sergeant, Johnny Marr) – 4:35
 "Timebomb" – 4:38
 "Zephyr" – 4:12
 "Never" – 4:46
 "Too Far Gone" (McCulloch, Sergeant, Marr) – 4:48
 "Mirrorball" – 3:56
 "Who's Been Sleeping in My Head" – 4:00
 "Hit by Something" – 3:28
 "Bed of Nails" – 3:51
 "Zephyr" – 4:54
 "Burned" – 5:45
 "Mirrorball" – 4:05
 "Rain on Me" – 5:35
 "Never" (Utah Saints 'Blizzard On' Mix) – 6:36

Disc two 
 "Holy Grail" – 7:07
 "Land of the Dying Sun" – 5:28
 "Razor's Edge" – 4:15
 "Not of This World" – 3:38
 "Subway Train" – 3:00
 "Work It on Out" – 4:25
 "Zephyr" (live) – 4:31
 "Feel My Pluse" (live) – 3:56
 "Sister Pain" (live) – 4:01
 "Lowdown" (live) (McCulloch, Sergeant, Marr) – 4:32
 "Never" (live) – 5:38
 "Holy Grail" (live) – 5:40
 "Too Far Gone" (live) (McCulloch, Sergeant, Marr) – 4:48
 "Burned" (live) – 4:44
 "Loose" (live) (The Stooges) – 4:01

Personnel 
 Producers:
 Electrafixion
 Mark Stent
 Musicians:
 Ian McCulloch – vocals, guitar
 Will Sergeant – guitar
 Leon de Sylva – bass
 Tony McGuigan – drums
 Julian Phillips – bass on live tracks
 George Phillips – drums on live tracks

Notes

References 
 2007 CD liner notes
 Discogs.com

1995 debut albums
Electrafixion albums
Warner Music Group albums